The Roman Catholic Diocese of Maradi is a diocese located in Maradi in Niger.  It is a suffragan in the province which includes the metropolitan archdiocese of Niamey.

History
 March 13, 2001: Established as Diocese of Maradi from Diocese of Niamey

Leadership
 Bishops of Maradi (Roman rite)
 Bishop Ambroise Ouédraogo (since March 13, 2001)

See also
Roman Catholicism in Niger

Sources
 GCatholic.org
 Catholic Hierarchy

Roman Catholic dioceses in Niger
Christian organizations established in 2001
Roman Catholic dioceses and prelatures established in the 21st century
2001 establishments in Niger
Maradi, Niger